Rosén is a Swedish surname.

Geographical distribution
As of 2014, 96.9% of all known bearers of the surname Rosén were residents of Sweden (frequency 1:1,475) and 1.5% of Norway (1:50,415).

In Sweden, the frequency of the surname was higher than national average (1:1,475) in the following counties:
 1. Gävleborg County (1:784)
 2. Kalmar County (1:824)
 3. Östergötland County (1:826)
 4. Kronoberg County (1:957)
 5. Dalarna County (1:1,007)
 6. Jönköping County (1:1,039)
 7. Södermanland County (1:1,193)
 8. Uppsala County (1:1,245)
 9. Örebro County (1:1,333)
 10. Halland County (1:1,470)

In the United States the surname is recorded as Rosen despite efforts by families and people with the surname to have it corrected. Populations with the name are known to live in Minnesota, Colorado, Washington, and New Jersey.

People
 Anton Rosén (Born 1991), Swedish motorcycle speedway rider 
 Bengt Rosén (1936–2017), Swedish politician
 Calle Rosén (born 1994), Swedish professional ice hockey defenceman
 Conny Rosén (born 1971), Swedish footballer
 Erik Rosén (1883–1967), Swedish film actor
 Gunhild Rosén (1855–1928), Swedish ballerina, choreographer and ballet master
 Gustav Rosén (1876–1942), Swedish newspaper owner, journalist and politician
 Jonas Rosén (born 1958), Swedish fencer
 Kjell Rosén (1921–1999), Swedish footballer
 Magnus Rosén (born 1963), Swedish musician
 Nils Rosén (1902–1951), Swedish footballer
 Robert Rosén (born 1987), Swedish professional ice hockey centre
 Sven Rosén (1887–1963), Swedish gymnast
 Sven Rosén (1708–1750), Swedish Radical-Pietistic writer and leader

See also
 Rosen

References

Swedish-language surnames